Papoose on the Loose is a 1961 American animated short film produced by Walter Lantz.

It was created as part of the Cartune Theatrical Cartoon Series.

Story

Papoose is bent on hunting.  His father, the chief, tells him not to.  Papoose does not listen, so the chief dresses himself in a bear costume to scare him out of the idea.

External links 

 

Walter Lantz Productions shorts
1960s American animated films
1961 films
1961 animated films
Universal Pictures short films
Universal Pictures animated short films
Films about hunters
1960s English-language films